The Brussels ISIL terror cell were a group accused of involvement in large-scale terrorist attacks in Paris in November 2015 (130 killed) and Brussels in early 2016 (32 killed), as well as other attacks against European targets. The terror cell is connected to the Islamic State of Iraq and the Levant (ISIL), a jihadist terrorist organisation primarily based in Syria and Iraq.

Background 
On 13 November 2015, a group of nine ISIL-inspired terrorists carried out a series of coordinated terrorist attacks across the French capital, Paris; 130 people died in the attacks, as were seven of the nine attackers. The remaining two attackers were tracked down five days later and killed in the 2015 Saint-Denis raid along with a third terrorist.

The police manhunt for further accomplices led them to Belgian capital, Brussels. Between the 21st and 25th of November, the city was placed in lockdown due to the potential of a serious terrorist attack occurring. On 15th March 2016, a police raid occurred in a house in Brussels in which a man was killed whilst others managed to evade police capture. A second raid occurred three days later on 18th March in which suspects were arrested. A second major attack then occurred on 22 March in Brussels in which coordinated bombings at the airport and at a metro station killed 32 people as well as three of the five attackers.

In June 2022, a total of 20 men were convicted of being involved in the terror cell that planned the Paris attacks.

2015 Paris assailants 
Three teams, comprising three people each, executed the November 2015 Paris attacks. They wore explosive vests and belts with identical detonators. Seven perpetrators died at the scenes of their attacks. The other two were killed five days later during the Saint-Denis police raid.

Stade de France attackers
Three suicide bombers blew themselves up near the Stade de France:

Bilal Hadfi 
Bilal Hadfi, a 20-year-old French citizen, Moroccan descent, who had been living in Belgium. Hadfi attempted to enter the Stade de France but blew himself up nearby after being denied entry. He spent time in Syria and was a suspected jihadist. In the months before the attacks, he was active on social media, posting pro-jihadist messages, and communicated with a Libyan branch of ISIL. Belgian prosecutors knew Hadfi had gone to fight in Syria but did not know of his return to the EU.

"Ahmad al-Mohammad"
Another bomber carried a passport belonging to a 25-year-old Syrian named "Ahmad al-Mohammad". A passport-holder claiming to be a Syrian refugee with that name was registered on Leros in October upon his arrival from Turkey. The dead attacker's fingerprints matched those taken at the registration on Leros. French officials concluded that "Ahmad al-Mohammad" is probably a dead Syrian soldier whose passport was stolen after he was killed in Syria. ISIS identified him as "Ukasah al-Iraqi", indicating that he was from Iraq. This was later confirmed in January 2017 when a declassified French intelligence file identified the bomber as Ammar Ramadan Mansour Mohamad al-Sabaawi, an Iraqi in his twenties from Mosul. ISIS paid al-Sabaawi's family $5,000 and a flock of sheep after his death.

"M. al-Mahmod"
The third bomber has not been named by French police yet, but his image released by the authorities has been matched by the BBC with a photo on arrival papers at Leros belonging to a man travelling together with "Ahmad al-Mohammed" under the name of "M. al-Mahmod". Like  al-Sabaawi, ISIS identified him as an Iraqi and called him "Ali al-Iraqi", but his true identity has never been determined.

Paris restaurant attackers 
Three men are thought to have carried the shootings at bars and restaurants in Paris:

Abdelhamid Abaaoud
Abdelhamid Abaaoud (8 April 1987 – 18 November 2015), also known by his two noms de guerre Abu Omar al-Soussi and Abu Umar al-Baljiki, was a Belgian-Moroccan Islamic terrorist, who had spent time in Syria, known as a place where radical groups operate and train. He was suspected of having organized multiple terror attacks in Belgium and France, and is known to have masterminded in the November 2015 Paris attacks. Prior to the Paris attacks, there was an international arrest warrant issued for Abaaoud for his activities in recruiting individuals to Islamic terrorism in Syria.

Ibrahim Abdeslam
Brahim Abdeslam, a 31-year-old French-Moroccan member of the Molenbeek terror cell living in Belgium, carried out shootings in the 10th and 11th arrondissements. Shortly afterwards, he blew himself up at the Comptoir Voltaire restaurant on the boulevard Voltaire.

Chakib Akrouh
Chakib Akrouh, a 25-year-old Belgian citizen of Moroccan descent, with the nom de guerre Dhul-Qarnayn al-Baljiki, who blew himself up during the Saint-Denis police raid that occurred five days after the Paris attacks. Akrouh was not identified until 15 January 2016.

Bataclan theatre attackers
Three other men attacked the Bataclan theatre using AKMs and took hostages. Two blew themselves up when police raided the theatre. The third was hit by police gunfire and his vest blew up when he fell. According to French police, they were:

Samy Amimour
Samy Amimour, a 28-year-old French citizen from Paris, of Algerian descent, who fought in Yemen and was known to the intelligence services, had reportedly been on the run from police since 2012 due to being wanted over terrorism related charges.

Omar Ismail Mostefai
Omar Ismail Mostefai, a 29-year-old Frenchman from the Paris suburb of Courcouronnes, of Algerian descent, travelled to Syria in 2013 and may have spent time in Algeria. In 2010, the French authorities had put Mostefai on a database as a suspected Islamic radicals. He was identified by a severed finger found inside the Bataclan. Mostefai was featured in an exhibition by artist Henrik Grimbäck in an Museum of Martyrs exhibition beside famous human rights activists like Martin Luther King.

Foued Mohamed-Aggad
Foued Mohamed-Aggad, a 23-year-old Frenchman from Wissembourg, of Algerian descent, who travelled to Syria in 2013.

2016 Brussels assailants

Ibrahim El Bakraoui 
Ibrahim El Bakraoui (9 October 1986 – 22 March 2016) was a Belgian national of Moroccan descent, confirmed to be one of the suicide bombers who attacked the Brussels Airport during the Brussels bombings in 2016.

Khalid El Bakraoui 
Khalid El Bakraoui (12 January 1989 – 22 March 2016) was a Belgian national of Moroccan descent and the brother of Ibrahim El Bakraoui, confirmed to be the suicide bomber who attacked Maalbeek metro station during the Brussels bombings.

Najim Laachraoui 
Najim Laachraoui (18 May 1991 – 22 March 2016) was a Belgian-Moroccan national, confirmed to be the second suicide bomber at the Brussels Airport in the Brussels bombings. He is also suspected of making the bombs used in the November 2015 Paris attacks. In addition, Laachraoui was a suspected accomplice of Salah Abdeslam, the surviving member of the group directly linked to the Paris attacks.

Mohamed Abrini 
Mohamed Abrini (born 27 December 1984) is a Belgian national of Moroccan descent who is alleged to have been involved in the planning and execution of the Paris attacks and the Brussels bombings. He was filmed together with Laachraoui and Ibrahim el-Bakraoui at the Brussels Airport before the bombings occurred. Abrini's brother died fighting for jihadists in Syria in 2014

Osama Krayem 
Osama Krayem (born 1992) is a Swedish national of Palestinian descent suspected of involvement in the Brussels bombings. Krayem was the second bomber at the Maalbeek metro station, having been filmed with Khalid El Bakraoui at another metro station minutes before the attack.

Other suspects

Salah Abdeslam 
Salah Abdeslam (born 15 September 1989) is a Belgian-born French national of Moroccan descent. He is accused of involvement in the attacks in Paris on 13 November 2015, through providing logistical support for the assailants and driving them to their target locations. He is thought to have been in charge of logistics for the group and was sentenced to life without parole in June 2022.

Hasna Aït Boulahcen

Hasna Aït Boulahcen was the cousin of the group ringleader Abdelhamid Abaaoud. She died of asphyxiation. Her family argued she was killed by an explosion from a suicide vest during the Saint-Denis raid. It was not clear if she detonated the vest or if she was killed by someone else detonating their suicide vest close by.

Hamza Attou, Mohamed Amri and Ali Oulkadi

After the Paris attacks, Salah Abdeslam escaped France and made his way back to Belgium with the help of 3 accomplices. Hamza Attou was charged for driving Abdeslam back to Brussels from Paris on the night of the attacks. Mohamed Amri was also said to be in the car with Attou and Abdeslam. On the way, they were checked by police at checkpoints three times without being arrested. Once in Brussels, Mohammed Amri left the vehicle, while Hamza Attou called Ali Oulkadi, a third suspect, to ask him to go to the Bockstael subway station. Oulkadi went for Attou and Abdeslam and accompanied them to a café, where Salah Abdeslam admitted to having been involved in the Paris attacks and said that his brother Brahim had killed himself with explosives. Following this discussion, Oulkadi drove Salah Abdeslam to Schaerbeek.

Sofien Ayari

Fired upon police with Salah Abdeslam before they were both arrested after the police raids. He was also suspected of planning another attack at Amsterdam airport with Osama Krayem

Mohamed Bakkali 
Suspected of providing logistical support through hiring safe houses and cars as well as making false identity documents to help ISIS fighters escape Syria

Muhammed Usman and Adel Haddidi

The Pakistani and Algerian nationals were accused of entering Europe as fake refugees with two of the attackers who blew themselves up at the Stade de France. It was claimed that they intended to participate in the attacks but were detained in Greece for having false passports. Usman is believed to be a bomb maker for a Pakistani militant group.

Oussama Atar and Yassine Atar

Atar was the head of an intelligence-gathering unit based in Raqqa while the Islamic State was at the height of power over its caliphate.

Intelligence teams believed to have identified him after searching for a man known as Abou Ahmad whose name emerged after the arrest of two men in Austria a few weeks after the attacks in Paris. The pair, an Algerian named Adel Haddadi and a Pakistani, were detained on the Greek island of Leros weeks earlier and were unable to travel to Paris with the two Iraqis who blew themselves up at the Stade de France in Paris. He has links to bombers who targeted Paris and Brussels and was the only man in intelligence teams investigation who was linked to both atrocities. He first traveled to Syria from Belgium in 2002 and then went back in 2004 before travelling to Iraq, where he was arrested for crossing the border illegally and jailed for 10 years in 2005. He was imprisoned in the famous Abu Ghraib prison, run by US forces. He returned to Belgium in 2012 but 7 years in jail had left him radicalized. Atar's younger brother Yassine was arrested around the time of the Brussels attacks and their mothers home has been raided several times.

He was killed in Syria 17 November 2017, though French authorities did not announce this publicly as this would acknowledge that assassinations outside the legal framework were used.

Haddad Asufi and Abdellah Chouaa

Convicted of allegedly helping  Abrini and Bakkali

Ali El Haddad Asufi and Farid Kharkhach

Asufi was convicted of supplying weapons whilst Kharkhach was convicted of providing false identity documents.

Ahmad Alkhald

A Syrian national who is presumed dead, accused of making the suicide belts.

Jean-Michel Clain and Fabien Clain

Two brothers from who featured in an IS video claiming responsibility for the attacks. Both are presumed dead in Syria

Ahmed Dahmani

A friend of Abdeslam wanted for providing logistical help. In jail in Turkey.

Obeida Aref Dibo

A Syrian IS member who is presumed dead and thought to be a planner of the attacks.

Mohamed Belkaid 
An Algerian national who died during the first police raid in Brussels after firing at police.

Zakaria Boufassil and Mohammed Ali Ahmed 
In July 2015, months before the Paris terror attacks, two men named Zakaria Boufassil and Mohammed Ali Ahmed met with one of the main suspects in the attacks, Mohamed Abrini, in a park in Birmingham, United Kingdom. They gave him £3,000 out of a bank account that was set up by another man who traveled to Syria to join ISIL. It was found that most of the money came from housing benefits. In December 2016, both men were found guilty for preparing acts of terrorism.

See also 
 2015 Brussels lockdown
 Cannes-Torcy cell
 Islamic terrorism

References 

Islamic State of Iraq and the Levant and Belgium
Islamic State of Iraq and the Levant and France
Islamic State of Iraq and the Levant members
Islamic terrorism in Belgium
Islamic terrorism in France
Terrorism in 2015
Terrorism in 2016
November 2015 Paris attacks
ISIS
Islamist mass murderers
Factions of the Islamic State of Iraq and the Levant